Conan is a 2004 action-adventure role-playing video game based on the literary character Conan the Barbarian created by Robert E. Howard. It was developed by Slovak developer Cauldron and released for the Xbox, GameCube, PlayStation 2, and Microsoft Windows in Europe.

Gameplay
Conan is a third-person action-adventure game with the majority of the action being real-time hack and slash combat, with additional puzzles. The player can acquire up to 14 different weapons and learn new fighting techniques similar to other role-playing video games. There are more than 70 levels, spanning from volcanoes to jungles, in which Conan faces 12 bosses and collects pieces of a legendary Atlantean sword.

There was a multiplayer mode via Xbox Live before it went offline, where players could compete in three different game modes, play in more than 16 different maps, and had 16 different characters to play as.

Story
The events take place in the mythical era from the original books and comics known as the "Hyborian Age". When Conan sees his home village of Grannach burnt to the ground by the mysterious Vulture cult, he begins his quest for revenge against them.

Reception

Conan received average reviews. It holds an average of 61% for Xbox and 51% for PC on aggregate website GameRankings.

References

External links

Conan at MobyGames

2004 video games
Action-adventure games
Action role-playing video games
Europe-exclusive video games
GameCube games
Hack and slash games
Multiplayer and single-player video games
PlayStation 2 games
Video games based on Conan the Barbarian
Video games developed in Slovakia
Windows games
Xbox games
TDK Mediactive games
Video games about cults